Winnifred Sarah Train  (14 February 1904 – 16 July 1979) was a notable New Zealand army and civilian nurse, hospital matron, and nurses' association leader. She was born in Waitotara, Wanganui, New Zealand, in 1904. Train was appointed an Officer of the Order of the British Empire in the 1965 New Year Honours.

References

1904 births
1979 deaths
New Zealand nurses
New Zealand military personnel of World War II
New Zealand women nurses
New Zealand Officers of the Order of the British Empire